ISO/IEC 10021, Information technology – Message Handling Systems (MHS) is the ISO/IEC standard which defines the overall system and service of an MHS and serves as a general overview of MHS.

Other aspects of Message Handling Systems and Services are defined in other parts of ISO/IEC 10021. The structure of ISO/IEC 10021 (all parts) defining the Message Handling System and Services is given in Table 1.

The technical aspects of MHS are defined in other parts of ISO/IEC 10021. The overall system architecture of MHS is defined in ISO/IEC 10021-2:1996.

Parts
 ISO/IEC 10021-1:2003 Part 1: System and service overview
 ISO/IEC 10021-2:2003 Overall architecture
 ISO/IEC 10021-4:2003 Message transfer system – Abstract service definition and procedures
 ISO/IEC 10021-5:1999 Message store: Abstract service definition
 ISO/IEC 10021-6:2003 Protocol specifications
 ISO/IEC 10021-7:2003 Interpersonal messaging system
 ISO/IEC 10021-8:1999 Part 8: Electronic Data Interchange Messaging Service 
 ISO/IEC 10021-9:1999 Electronic Data Interchange Messaging System
 ISO/IEC 10021-10:1999 MHS routing
 ISO/IEC TR 10021-11:1999 MHS Routing – Guide for messaging systems managers

See also 
 ISO/IEC JTC 1/SC 6

References 
 ISO Catalogue in the ISO website
 Intelligent Transport Systems Standards By Bob Williams

10021